The Past (Gozašte) is a 2013 French–Italian–Iranian drama film, written and directed by Iranian director Asghar Farhadi and starring Bérénice Bejo, Tahar Rahim and Ali Mosaffa.

The film was nominated for the Palme d'Or award at the 2013 Cannes Film Festival and won the festival's Prize of the Ecumenical Jury. Bejo also won the festival's Best Actress Award. It was shown at the 2013 Toronto International Film Festival.

The film was selected as the Iranian entry for the Best Foreign Language Film at the 86th Academy Awards, but it was not nominated. The film was nominated for Best Foreign Language Film at the 71st Golden Globe Awards.

Plot
Ahmad, an Iranian man, returns to France after four years to finalise his divorce with his wife Marie. On the way to her home, he learns that she has begun a relationship with Samir, the owner of a dry cleaning service and he is to share a room with Samir's son Fouad. At Marie's request, he speaks to her daughter from a previous marriage, Lucie, regarding her recent troubled behavior. Lucie disapproves of Marie's new relationship.

Ahmad and Marie attend court to complete their divorce. Just before the meeting with the officials, she tells him that she is pregnant with Samir's child. Ahmad continues to counsel Lucie, hoping to reconcile her to the situation. She reveals that Samir is still married and his wife is in a coma after a suicide attempt, caused by the revelation that Samir and Marie were conducting an affair. Samir tells Ahmad that his wife suffered from depression and the suicide attempt was in fact caused by an incident with a customer in his shop. His wife was unaware of his affair and he arranges for Naïma, his employee, who witnessed both the suicide attempt and the incident in the shop, to meet with Lucie.

After hearing Naïma's story, Lucie becomes distressed and confesses that she forwarded Marie and Samir’s email correspondence to Samir's wife the day before she tried to kill herself, after calling her at the dry cleaning shop. Lucie disappears, and Ahmad and Samir search for her.  Ahmad finds Lucie, who has been staying with a friend, and tries to convince her to tell Marie what she did, saying that Marie has a right to know, now that she is carrying Samir's child. Lucie does so and Marie becomes enraged, telling Lucie to leave, which she does. Ahmad calms the situation and Marie goes after Lucie, asking her to come back, which she does.

After questioning what feelings he may still hold for his wife, Marie tells Samir what Lucie did. Samir finds this hard to accept and questions Naïma about the events leading up his wife's suicide attempt. Naïma states his wife wasn't even in the shop the day that Lucie said she called. After Marie accuses Lucie of lying, Lucie maintains her version of events saying that she spoke to a woman with an accent on the phone. Samir realizes that she actually spoke to Naïma, who then gave Lucie his wife's email address. He confronts Naïma, who confesses and explains that his wife had always been jealous of her and had been trying to get her either sacked or deported from France and had initiated the confrontation with the customer. However, Naïma believes that his wife never read the emails, because she came into the shop and chose to drink bleach in front of her, instead of in front of Samir or Marie.

Samir and Marie discuss the events and their relationship. Samir decides that they should focus on their future, while Marie appears conflicted. Ahmad prepares to return to Iran. He says farewell to the children and attempts to talk to Marie about the end of their marriage, but Marie does not let him, stating that she doesn't need to know such things now. Meanwhile, Samir visits his wife in the hospital with a selection of perfumes, which the doctors have recommended in order to possibly initiate a response. He sprays onto his neck some of his cologne and leans over her lying comatose in her hospital bed.  With his face close to his wife's he whispers to her to squeeze his hand if she can smell it. A tear rolls down her check but she remains comatose, and he looks down at her hand, which may or may not be holding his. It is unclear in the final scene whether she is responsive or not.

Cast

 Bérénice Bejo as Marie Brisson
 Tahar Rahim as Samir
 Ali Mosaffa as Ahmad
 Pauline Burlet as Lucie
 Elyes Aguis as Fouad
 Jeanne Jestin as Léa
 Sabrina Ouazani as Naïma
 Babak Karimi as Shahryar
 Valeria Cavalli as Valeria
 Eleonora Marino as Marie's colleague
 Hossein Rahmani Manesh as Pooya

Reception
The film received universal critical acclaim. It holds a 93% "certified fresh" rating on review aggregator website Rotten Tomatoes, based on 144 reviews with a weighted average score of 8.2/10 and the site's consensus: "Beautifully written, sensitively directed, and powerfully acted, The Past serves as another compelling testament to Asghar Farhadi's gift for finely layered drama." On Metacritic, the film has a normalized score of 85% based on 41 reviews, indicating "universal acclaim".

The German-English website KinoCritics.com wrote the three main actors Bejo, Rahim and Mosaffa were convincing in their roles and added "a natural liveliness" to their scenes.

Accolades

See also

 2013 in film
 List of French films of 2013
 List of Iranian films of the 2010s
 List of Iranian submissions for the Academy Award for Best Foreign Language Film
 List of Italian films of the 2010s
 List of submissions to the 86th Academy Awards for Best Foreign Language Film

References

External links
  at Sony Pictures Classics
 
 
 
 
 

2013 films
2013 drama films
2013 multilingual films
French drama films
Iranian multilingual films
French multilingual films
Italian drama films
2010s French-language films
2010s Persian-language films
Films about dysfunctional families
Films set in France
Films shot in Paris
Films directed by Asghar Farhadi
Sony Pictures Classics films
StudioCanal films
2010s French films